Giovanni Terrani (born 12 October 1994) is an Italian football player who plays as a forward for  club Trento.

Club career
He made his professional debut in the Lega Pro for Pro Patria on 30 August 2014 in a game against Torres.

On 14 January 2019, he signed with Serie C club Piacenza.

On 14 July 2019, he signed a 3-year contract with Bari. On 18 September 2020, he was loaned to Como.

On 31 August 2021, he moved to Padova.

On 28 January 2023, Terrani signed a 2.5-year contract with Trento.

References

External links
 

1994 births
People from Vigevano
Sportspeople from the Province of Pavia
Footballers from Lombardy
Living people
Italian footballers
Italy youth international footballers
Association football forwards
A.C. Monza players
Aurora Pro Patria 1919 players
S.S.D. Lucchese 1905 players
A.C. Perugia Calcio players
Piacenza Calcio 1919 players
S.S.C. Bari players
Como 1907 players
Calcio Padova players
A.C. Trento 1921 players
Serie B players
Serie C players